Motti is a masculine given name, sometimes a short form of Mordecai or Mordechai, and a surname which may refer to:

People:
 Motti Aroesti (born 1954), Israeli former basketball player
 Motti Daniel (born 1963), Israeli basketball player
 Motti Ivanir (born 1964), Israeli football head coach and former player
 Motti Kakoun (born 1972), Israeli retired footballer
 Motti Lerner (born 1949), Israeli playwright and screenwriter
 Motti Malka, Israeli politician and mayor, first elected in 2003
 Motti Mizrachi (born 1946), Israeli multimedia artist
 Alessandro Motti (born 1979), Italian tennis player
 William Motti (born 1964), French retired decathlete

Fictional characters:
 Admiral Conan Antonio Motti, a fictional character from the Star Wars universe

See also
 Moti (disambiguation)
 Motty, an elephant

Masculine given names